Anterhynchium is an Afrotropical, Indomalayan, Australian and Palearctic genus of potter wasps. As in many species of wasp, female wasps defend against predation using a modified ovipositor to sting predators. Like some other wasps in the Vespidae family, male wasps can produce a "pseudo-sting" with two sharp spines on either side of their genitals; however, unlike in the females, this "sting" is venomless.

Species
The following species are classified within the genus Anterhynchium:

Anterhynchium abdominale (Illiger, 1802)
Anterhynchium aestuans Saussure, 1863
Anterhynchium alecto (Lepeletier, 1841)
Anterhynchium andreanum (de Saussure, 1890)
Anterhynchium astrophilum Giordani Soika, 1996
Anterhynchium auromaculatum (de Saussure, 1852)
Anterhynchium basimacula (Cameron, 1897)
Anterhynchium beta Schulthess, 1928
Anterhynchium coracinum Vecht, 1963
Anterhynchium decoratum (de Saussure, 1856)
Anterhynchium fallax (de Saussure, 1855)
Anterhynchium flammeus Giordani Soika, 1937
Anterhynchium flavolineatum (Smith, 1857)
Anterhynchium flavomarginatum Smith, 1852
Anterhynchium flavopunctatum Smith, 1852
Anterhynchium fulvipenne Smith, 1859
Anterhynchium gamma Schulthess, 1928
Anterhynchium grandidieri (de Saussure, 1890)
Anterhynchium grayi (de Saussure, 1853)
Anterhynchium hamatum Vecht, 1963
Anterhynchium histrionicum (Gerstaecker, 1857)
Anterhynchium indosinense Gusenleitner, 1998
Anterhynchium luctuosum (Gerstaecker, 1857)
Anterhynchium madecassum (de Saussure, 1852)
Anterhynchium melanopterum Sk. Yamane, 1981
Anterhynchium mellyi (de Saussure, 1853)
Anterhynchium mephisto Gribodo, 1892
Anterhynchium natalense (de Saussure, 1855)
Anterhynchium nigrocinctum (de Saussure, 1853)
Anterhynchium nimbosum Giordani Soika, 1987
Anterhynchium osborni (Bequaert, 1918)
Anterhynchium pacificum (Kirsch, 1878)
Anterhynchium pensum Giordani Soika, 1937 
Anterhynchium rufipes (Fabricius, 1775)
Anterhynchium rufonigrum Bequaert, 1918
Anterhynchium synagroides  (de Saussure, 1852)
Anterhynchium tamarinum  (de Saussure, 1853)
Anterhynchium tasmaniense  (de Saussure, 1853)
Anterhynchium uncatum (Tullgren, 1904)
Anterhynchium vastator Giordani Soika, 1983
Anterhynchium woodfordi Meade-Waldo, 1910
Anterhynchium yunnanense Giordani Soika, 1973

References

Potter wasps